
Gmina Okonek is an urban-rural gmina (administrative district) in Złotów County, Greater Poland Voivodeship, in west-central Poland.

Villages
Apart from the town of Okonek, Gmina Okonek contains the villages and settlements of Anielin, Babi Dwór, Borki, Borucino, Brokęcino, Brzozówka, Chwalimie, Ciosaniec, Ciosaniec-Bolkowo, Czersk, Drzewice, Glinki Mokre, Glinki Suche, Kruszka, Lędyczek, Łomczewo, Lotyń, Lubnica, Lubnicki Młyn, Lubniczka, Pniewo, Podgaje, Przybysław, Rydzynka, Skoki, Węgorzewo and Wojnówko.

Neighbouring gminas
Gmina Okonek is bordered by the gminas of Borne Sulinowo, Czarne, Debrzno, Jastrowie, Lipka, Szczecinek and Złotów.

References
Polish official population figures 2006

Okonek
Złotów County